Cristián Fernando Muñoz (born 1 July 1977) is an Argentine-born Chilean former professional footballer who played as goalkeeper. He is best known for his spells at Colo-Colo and Huachipato. Muñoz was nicknamed El Tigre (Spanish: the tiger) for his skills.

He was member of the Argentina U20 squad that won the 1997 FIFA World Youth Championship celebrated in Malaysia.

He was the last active footballer to have played professionally alongside Diego Maradona.

Club career

Early career
Born in Junín, Buenos Aires, Muñoz started his career at his local village team Sarmiento in 1994, moving at the age of 20 to the Argentine giant club, Boca Juniors, after the 1997 FIFA World Youth Championship. He made his competitive debut for Boca against Newell's Old Boys on 14 September of that year (1997). During his stay in the club, he was loaned to teams as Los Andes in 2000 and Talleres de Córdoba in 2001, remaining him in this club until 2002. In the next season, he returned to Boca as substitute of Roberto Abbondanzieri, winning the Copa Libertadores and then the Copa Sudamericana.

After two seasons in Argentina as substitute, in January 2005, Muñoz was signed by the Chilean side Huachipato for play the 2005 Torneo de Apertura. He made his club's competitive debut in a 2–1 league away win over Deportes Temuco on 6 February. The club also impressed finishing in the semi-finals of the league championship playoffs. He made 100 appearances in all competitions in two years. Muñoz played a key role in Huachipato's qualification to the 2007 Copa Sudamericana playoffs after of finish in the fourth position of the Apertura tournament with 40 points behind Audax Italiano with 44 points.

Colo-Colo
Muñoz was signed by defending Chilean Primera División champions Colo-Colo in July 2007 for an undisclosed fee, with the mission of replace to his countrymen Sebastián Cejas in the goal, who left the club for high costs. In his arrival to the club, he was assigned with the jersey number 1, because the departure of Cejas, who wears this number. He made his unofficial debut for the club in a 1–1 pre-season draw with the club's rival Universidad de Chile for the Copa Gato.

His competitive debut for the club came on 29 July 2007 in the 3–0 away victory against Deportes Concepción. He received more competition when Rainer Wirth broke into the first team during the first games of the 2007 Clausura, and this made a rotation between the keepers, but because to the several errors of Wirth, Muñoz became in the club's first goalkeeper. He played in the Clausura final against Universidad de Concepción in the 3–0 win, being this his first honour for the club, and also the club completed four titles consecutives since 2006 under the coach Claudio Borghi, being an historic record in the Chilean football. In the next season, Muñoz was runner-up of the 2008 Apertura, but champion of the Clausura tournament.

International career
With the Argentina Under-20 team, Muñoz won the 1997 FIFA World Youth Championship in Malaysia, being teammate of players like Juan Román Riquelme, Esteban Cambiasso, Luciano Galletti, Diego Placente, among others. He was substitute of Leo Franco during the tournament and played in the second round against England under-20 team, in a game that finished in a 2–1 win of his country.

Club statistics

Honours

Club
Boca Juniors
 Primera División Argentina: 1999 Clausura, 2003 Apertura
 Copa Libertadores: 2001, 2003
 Copa Sudamericana: 2004

Colo-Colo
 Primera División de Chile: 2007-C, 2008-C, 2009-C

Huachipato
 Primera División de Chile: 2012 Clausura

Universidad de Concepción
Primera B de Chile: 2013 Transición
Copa Chile: 2014–15

International
 FIFA World Youth Championship: 1997

References

External links

 Argentine Primera statistics

1977 births
Living people
People from Junín, Buenos Aires
Sportspeople from Buenos Aires Province
Argentine footballers
Argentine expatriate footballers
Argentina youth international footballers
Argentina under-20 international footballers
Association football goalkeepers
Boca Juniors footballers
Club Atlético Los Andes footballers
Talleres de Córdoba footballers
Colo-Colo footballers
C.D. Huachipato footballers
Universidad de Concepción footballers
Club Atlético Sarmiento footballers
Primera B de Chile players
Chilean Primera División players
Argentine Primera División players
Expatriate footballers in Chile
Argentine expatriate sportspeople in Chile
Naturalized citizens of Chile